Hubert Boughton (11 October 1858 – 26 March 1902) was an English cricketer. He played for Gloucestershire between 1884 and 1888.

References

1858 births
1902 deaths
English cricketers
Gloucestershire cricketers
People from Westbury-on-Severn
Sportspeople from Gloucestershire